The 1883 Columbian University football team was an American football team that represented Columbian University (now known as George Washington University) as an independent during the 1883 college football season. They had a 0–2 record with no head coach.

Schedule

References

Columbian
George Washington Colonials football seasons
Columbian University football